Nanda Lal Roka Chhetri is a Nepali politician and a member of the House of Representatives of the federal parliament of Nepal. He was elected from Banke-3 constituency, representing CPN UML.

References

Living people
Communist Party of Nepal (Unified Marxist–Leninist) politicians
Nepal Communist Party (NCP) politicians
Khas people
Place of birth missing (living people)
People from Banke District
21st-century Nepalese people
Nepal MPs 2017–2022
1949 births